The National Quantum Initiative Act is an Act of Congress passed on December 13, 2018, and signed into law on December 21, 2018. The law gives the United States a plan for advancing quantum technology, particularly quantum computing. It was passed unanimously by the United States Senate and was signed into law by President Donald Trump. The National Quantum Initiative (NQI) provides an umbrella under which a number of government agencies develop and operate programs related to improving the climate for quantum science and technology in the US, coordinated by The National Quantum Coordination Office. These agencies include the National Institute of Standards and Technology (NIST), the National Science Foundation (NSF), and the Department of Energy (DOE). Under the authority of the NQI, the NSF and the DOE have established new research Centers and Institutes, and NIST has established The Quantum Economic Development Consortium (QED-C), a consortium of industrial, academic, and governmental entities.

References

External links 
 As codified in 15 U.S.C. chapter 114 of the United States Code from the LII
 As codified in 15 U.S.C. chapter 114 of the United States Code from the US House of Representatives
 National Quantum Initiative Act (PDF/details) as amended in the GPO Statute Compilations collection
 National Quantum Initiative Act (PDF/details) as enacted in the US Statutes at Large

Quantum computing
Science and technology in the United States
2018 in computing
Acts of the 115th United States Congress
United States federal computing legislation